Giannis Pechlivanopoulos (born 9 June 1994) is a Greek professional footballer who plays as a left-back for Super League 2 club Egaleo.

References

1994 births
Living people
Greek footballers
Greek expatriate footballers
Football League (Greece) players
Gamma Ethniki players
Cypriot Second Division players
Niki Volos F.C. players
Fokikos A.C. players
Panargiakos F.C. players
A.P.S. Zakynthos players
PAEEK players
Ayia Napa FC players
Digenis Akritas Morphou FC players
Association football defenders
Footballers from Veria
Asteras Vlachioti F.C. players